Fuxing Island is a Shanghai Metro station located on Line 12 within Fuxing Island, a part of Yangpu District, Shanghai. The station opened on 29 December 2013.

History 

Description 
An underground structure with a single island platform, the station is located along Gongqing Road, the main roadway that serves the island. The island, also formerly known as  Point Island, is located in the Huangpu River and is separated from the west bank by the Fuxing Island canal.

Due to its proximity to the Huangpu River, including the Zhujiamen wharf and Hudong shipyard on the other side of the river in Pudong, it lies on one of the deepest tunnel sections in the Shanghai Metro system. The platform is located on the fourth underground floor, with the third floor used for equipment, second floor used as the station concourse, and first floor used for shops. The tunnel depth is due to the fact that the line must pass under the flood wall foundations of the shipyard and wharf.

Exits and amenities 
There are three exits, numbered 2 through 4, of which only two exits are open. Exit 2 is located on the east side of the station, close to Gongqing Road, while exit 4 is located on the west side of the station, facing the Fuxing Island canal. Washrooms are available outside the fare-paid zone, near exit 2. The station is fully accessible.

Places nearby 
 Fuxing Island Park

References 

Railway stations in Shanghai
Line 12, Shanghai Metro
Shanghai Metro stations in Yangpu District
Railway stations in China opened in 2013